The 1981 UNLV Rebels football team was an American football team that represented the University of Nevada, Las Vegas as an independent during the 1981 NCAA Division I-A football season. In their sixth and final year under head coach Tony Knap, the team compiled a 6–6 record.

A notable win was the road victory over eighth-ranked BYU in October, who were without starting quarterback Jim McMahon, replaced by sophomore Steve Young.

Approaching age 67, Knap retired after the season, and was succeeded by Harvey Hyde, the head coach at Pasadena City College.

Schedule

Roster

References

UNLV
UNLV Rebels football seasons
UNLV Rebels football